Corneliu "Cornel" Marin (born 19 January 1953) is a retired Romanian sabre fencer. He competed at the 1976, 1980 and 1984 Olympics and won team bronze medals in 1976 and 1984. He won three more team medals at the world championships in 1974–1977. In 1977 he was named Best Fencer of the Year in Romania.

As a teenager Marin was trained as a fencer and jeweler. He eventually chose fencing as his profession, and worked as a fencing coach at CSA Steaua București after retiring from competitions in 1985.

References

External links
 

1953 births
Living people
Romanian male fencers
Romanian sabre fencers
Olympic fencers of Romania
Fencers at the 1976 Summer Olympics
Fencers at the 1980 Summer Olympics
Fencers at the 1984 Summer Olympics
Olympic bronze medalists for Romania
Olympic medalists in fencing
Sportspeople from Bucharest
Medalists at the 1976 Summer Olympics
Medalists at the 1984 Summer Olympics
Universiade medalists in fencing
Universiade gold medalists for Romania
Medalists at the 1977 Summer Universiade
20th-century Romanian people
21st-century Romanian people